Samir Chammam is a Tunisian football manager.

References

Year of birth missing (living people)
Living people
Tunisian football managers
East Riffa Club managers
Al-Muharraq SC managers
Manama Club managers
Dhofar Club managers
Tunisian expatriate football managers
Expatriate football managers in Bahrain
Tunisian expatriate sportspeople in Bahrain
Expatriate football managers in Oman
Tunisian expatriate sportspeople in Oman